Rogers Hall School was a college preparatory finishing school for girls with day and boarding students in Lowell, Massachusetts. Founded by Emily and Elizabeth Rogers, who donated their family's property for the school, it was open for 80 years until 1973. Its first principal, Mrs. E.P. Underhill, remained at the school for 18 years.

The school's literary magazine was known as Splinters.

The property is now an apartment complex for seniors and people with disabilities.

The school archives are in the collection of the University of Massachusetts at Lowell.

Alumni
Blanche Ames Ames
Starr Faithfull (dropped out shortly before graduation)
Edith Nourse Rogers
Rebecca Tobey

References

External links
Lowell’s Rogers Hall School for Girls from the Lowell Historical Society

Defunct schools in Massachusetts
Finishing schools
Defunct girls' schools in the United States
Education in Lowell, Massachusetts
Schools in Lowell, Massachusetts
Educational institutions disestablished in 1973
1973 disestablishments in Massachusetts
1922 establishments in Massachusetts
Educational institutions established in 1922